This is a list of the members of the second parliament of the Australian Capital Territory Legislative Assembly, which operated from 1992 to 1995. It was the last to be elected under the one-electorate modified D'Hondt method, before the Territory was divided up into three electorates, as per the current system.

 Helen Szuty was elected on the Moore Independents Group ticket, but sat in the Assembly as an independent.
 Liberal member Lou Westende resigned on 25 July 1994. The vacancy was filled by Liberal Bill Stefaniak.

See also
1992 Australian Capital Territory general election

Members of Australian Capital Territory parliaments by term
20th-century Australian politicians